Seweryna Szmaglewska (Seweryna Maria Szmaglewska-Wiśniewska) (February 11, 1916 – July 7, 1992) was a Polish writer, known for both books for children and adults alike. Her novels "Czarne Stopy" (Black Feet) and "Dymy nad Birkenau" (Smoke over Birkenau) are compulsory reading in Polish schools.

She was born on February 11, 1916, in Przygłów near Piotrków Trybunalski, then in Central Powers-occupied part of the Kingdom of Poland. She graduated from the Free Polish University and went on to study at the Polish language and literature faculties of the Jagiellonian University of Cracow and the Łódź University. Between 1942 and 1945 she was an inmate of the Auschwitz-Birkenau concentration camp after spending two months in the prisons of Piotrków and Częstochowa. In 1945 she successfully escaped the Nazis during a "death march". As a Nazi camp survivor, she was one of very few Poles to testify at the Nuremberg Trials.

After the war she went on to be a successful writer. Initially focusing on her war-time experiences ("Dymy nad Birkenau", "Łączy nas gniew", "Niewinni w Norymberdze"), with time she also started publishing novels for teenagers. Her best-known novel "" (Black Feet; published in 1960) was later turned into a  1986 film (premiered in 1987) by Waldemar Podgórski. In 1973 the continuation of the novel, Nowy ślad Czarnych Stóp (A New Trail of Black Feet), was published.

In 1946 she married Witold Wiśniewski, whom she met earlier in Oświęcim. They had two sons: Witold and Jack. Seweryna Szmaglewska died on July 7, 1992, in Warsaw and interred in Bródno Cemetery.

Awards and decorations
Her awards include:
Złotym Krzyżem Zasługi (1953),
Krzyżem Komandorskim Orderu Odrodzenia Polski (1960),
Nagrodą I stopnia Ministra Kultury i Sztuki za całokształt twórczości literackiej ze szczególnym uwzględnieniem „Dymów nad Birkenau” i „Niewinnych w Norymberdze” (1973),
Orderem Sztandaru Pracy I klasy (1978).
Nagrodą specjalną Kwatery Głównej ZHP za powieść „Nowy ślad Czarnych Stóp” (1979)

References

1916 births
1992 deaths
Polish children's writers
20th-century Polish novelists
Polish women children's writers
Auschwitz concentration camp survivors
People from Piotrków County
Burials at Bródno Cemetery
20th-century Polish women